Michael McClelland is a Canadian architect with a history of experience in heritage conservation. He is a founding principal of the Toronto-based firm ERA Architects Inc., as well as an author of several books.

Early life and education 
McClelland graduated from the University of Toronto in 1981 with a Bachelor of Architecture (BArch).

Career

Architecture and conservation (1981–1990) 
Prior to the establishment of ERA Architects Inc. in 1990, McClelland served as a member of the Toronto Historical Board as an adviser on municipal topics such as permit and development applications, as well as municipal planning and preservation. He has been chair of the Toronto Society of Architects, and has been a member of the Society for the Study of Architecture in Canada. His work with the Ontario Association of Architects has included roles such as member of the Centennial Committee, heritage restoration consultant, and graduate associate. He is currently a registered member of the Ontario Association of Architects. 

His work during this time period also concerned heritage conservation, in the realms of heritage planning and urban design; in 1984, McClelland became one of the founding members of the Canadian Association of Professional Heritage Consultants (CAPHC).

ERA Architects Inc. 
McClelland established the firm ERA Architects Inc. (ERA) in conjunction with fellow architect Edwin Rowse in 1990, based out of Toronto, Ontario. The firm has evolved since its foundation to specialize in heritage conservation, as well as in the conservation of cultural and built environments. Projects the firm has been involved ininclude the Distillery District, the Don Valley Brick Works, and the King Edward Hotel, all located in Toronto. McClelland has been credited as the heritage architect for projects such as the adjustments made to the Royal Ontario Museum and the Art Gallery of Ontario, as well as a member of the adaptive reuse design team for the Don Jail and the proposal for the Commissioner's Park in Toronto's Port Lands. 

Ever since his initial partnership with Rowse upon the foundation of their firm, the two have retained a close working relationship throughout their careers.

Publications 
McClelland has co-authored several books on the cultural potential and impacts of Canadian architecture and urban planning, for which he is also credited as an editor. His first book, East/West: A Guide to Where People Live in Downtown Toronto, was published in 2000 in collaboration with Mark Fram and Nancy Byrtus as a selection of housing and development testimonies provided by a variety of sources, followed by Concrete Toronto: A Guide to Concrete Architecture from the Fifties to the Seventies, an investigation into Toronto's historical use of concrete, with Graeme Stewart in 2007. Concrete Toronto: A Guide to Concrete Architecture from the Fifties to the Seventies contains contributions from professionals such as original architects, city planners, local practitioners, historians, journalists, and academics, as well as resources such as archival photos, drawings, and case studies. Since its publication, the book has received the following awards:

 Heritage Toronto Award (Book): Award of Excellence, 2008
 Design Exchange Award (Visual Communications Content & Editorial): Award of Merit, 2008
 Canadian Association of Heritage Professionals (Communications): Award of Merit, 2008

The Ward: The Life and Loss of Toronto's First Immigrant Neighbourhood, published in 2015 in collaboration with Toronto journalist John Lorinc, Toronto historian Ellen Scheinberg, and ERA Heritage Specialist Tatum Taylor, features a series of essays written by a spectrum of contributors on the evolution of late 19th century Toronto and its architectural culture. The book received the Award of Merit for Heritage Education from the Canadian Association of Heritage Professionals in 2015, as well as a nomination for the Toronto Book Awards in 2016. Its successor, The Ward Uncovered: The Archaeology of Everyday Life, was published in 2018 in collaboration with John Lorinc, Holly Martelle, and Tatum Taylor. The book received the Award of Merit for Heritage Education, Awareness and Scholarship in 2018 from the Canadian Association of Heritage Professionals.

Awards and recognition 
McClelland has received the Ontario Association of Architects Award of Excellence, the Canadian Architect Award of Merit, and the City of Toronto Urban Design Award of Excellence. In 1999, he was awarded certificates of recognition from the Ontario Association of Architects and the Toronto Society of Architects. In 2006, McClelland was made a fellow of the Royal Architectural Institute of Canada.

References 

Year of birth missing (living people)
Living people
Canadian architects
University of Toronto alumni